Crusaders for Democracy is a Tamil political party led by Nadesapillai Vithyatharan a Journalist who was the Editor of the Uthayan and  consists of former LTTE cadres. It was started the near the Nallur Kandaswamy temple where Thileepan fasted to death in a hunger strike against the IPKF.
The party was started after the Tamil National Alliance refused to nominate them for political reasons. However, Crusaders for Democracy will contest as an independent group but will not campaign against the  Tamil National Alliance and will contest only from Jaffna  as it did not want to split Tamil votes in other areas.

References

Sri Lankan Tamil nationalist parties
Political parties in Sri Lanka
Indian Peace Keeping Force